Charles Douglas Poindexter (born February 27, 1942) is an American politician. He had been a Republican member of the Virginia House of Delegates since 2008, representing the 9th district, made up of Patrick County plus parts of Franklin and Henry Counties. He was defeated in the 2021 Republican primary by Wren Williams.

Electoral history

Notes

External links

1942 births
Living people
Republican Party members of the Virginia House of Delegates
University of Lynchburg alumni
George Washington University alumni
People from Franklin County, Virginia
Politicians from Roanoke, Virginia
21st-century American politicians